Counterterrorism Special Detachment 88, or Densus 88, is a tier one Indonesian National Police counter-terrorism squad formed on 30 June 2003, after the 2002 Bali bombings. It is funded, equipped, and trained by the United States through the Diplomatic Security Service's Antiterrorism Assistance Program and Australia.

The unit has worked with considerable success against the jihadi terrorist cells linked to Central Java–based Islamist movement Jemaah Islamiyah.

History
Detachment 88 was formed after the 2002 Bali bombings and became operational in 2003. The name of the organization is a result of a senior Indonesian police official mishearing "ATA" in a briefing on the Diplomatic Security Service's Antiterrorism Assistance Program as "88". He thought it would be a good name as the number 8 is a lucky number in Asia and other officials lacked the courage to correct him. The bilateral initiative that started Detachment 88 also started Jakarta Centre for Law Enforcement Cooperation (JCLEC). In July 2003, the first 30 Indonesian National Police officers were trained under to serve as the unit's first members under the Anti-Terrorism Assistance Initiative.

Detachment 88 has disrupted the activities of Central Java–based Islamist movement Jemaah Islamiyah (JI) and many of JI's top operatives have been arrested or killed. Abu Dujana, suspected leader of JI's military wing and its possible emir, was apprehended on June 9, 2007. Azahari Husin was shot and killed in 2005. The Indonesian terrorist organization suffered a further blow when arguably its last surviving and at-large prominent figure, Noordin Mohammad Top was killed in a shootout with Detachment 88 on 17 September 2009 at Solo, Central Java.

Detachment 88 is assisted by foreign agencies, including the Australian Federal Police, in forensic sciences including DNA analysis, and communications monitoring. In pre-emptive strikes in Java, the unit thwarted attack plans to material assembly.

Detachment 88 operators were involved in an operation in Poso, where 10 people, including a policeman, were killed in a gunfight during a high-risk arrest operation on 22 January 2007.

In 2007, Detachment 88 arrested and interrogated West Papuan human rights lawyer, Iwangin Sabar Olif, and charged him with incitement and insulting the head of state, because he sent an SMS text message critical of the Indonesian military and president.

Six members of a little-known terror cell called Katibah GR, or Cell GR, were arrested by counter- terrorism unit Densus 88 after carrying out a raid in Batam in August 2016. Police said their leader had been planning a rocket attack on Marina Bay, Singapore together with a Syrian-based Indonesian ISIS militant.

Training
This special unit is being funded by the US government through its State Department's Diplomatic Security Service (DSS), under the ATA. The unit is currently being trained in Megamendung, 50 km south of Jakarta, by the CIA, FBI, US Secret Service, and Australian Federal Police.

Most of these instructors were ex-US special forces personnel. Training is also carried out with the aid of Australian Special Forces and various intelligence agencies.

Detachment 88 is designed to become an anti-terrorist unit that is capable of countering various terrorist threats, from bomb threats to hostage situations. This 400-personnel strong special force went fully operational in 2005.  It consists of investigators, explosive experts, and an attack unit that includes snipers. As of 2017, the unit have 1,300 personnel assigned to it.

Weapons
Detachment 88 officers are frequently seen armed with a M4A1 carbine when an operation or a raid is being conducted while the Glock 17 pistol is used as the standard sidearm.

They also use a varied arsenal of weapons such as the Heckler & Koch MP5 submachine gun, Heckler & Koch MP7 Submachine gun, Steyr AUG assault rifles, Heckler & Koch G36C assault rifles, Remington 700 and Armalite AR-10 sniper rifles, Knight's Armament Company SR-25 Marksman Rifles, M14 Battle Rifles, Ithaca 37 and Remington 870 shotguns, and Heckler & Koch HK416 rifles.

Allegations of torture and deaths in custody
The unit has been accused of involvement of torture.  In August 2010, Amnesty International said in an urgent appeal that Indonesia had arrested Moluccan activists, and they had anxiety that the activists would be tortured by Detachment 88.  In September 2010, the death of Malukan political prisoner Yusuf Sipakoly allegedly caused by the gross human rights abuses by Detachment 88. In March 2016, the Indonesian National Commission on Human Rights stated that at least 121 terror suspects had died in custody since 2007

While acknowledging that Australia did train Detachment 88, Foreign affairs minister in 2012, Bob Carr, said he wasn't sure if the allegations were true, but would follow up.

References

External links
 Unofficial Site

Specialist law enforcement agencies of Indonesia
Non-military counterterrorist organizations